Beta Sigma Omicron is a defunct national sorority. It was founded on December 12, 1888 and merged with Zeta Tau Alpha on August 7, 1964.

History

Its founders were:
 Eulalie Hockaday
 Kathering Turner
 Maude Haines.

By  the sorority had 10 active chapters and 3 alumnae associations. These 10 chapters were at Belmont College, Brenau College, Centenary College (Cleveland, TN), Central College, Fairmont Seminary, Hardin College, Liberty Ladies' College (Liberty, MO), Stephens College, Synodical College, and Transylvania College. Early expansion went primarily to "women's schools" in the southern states, a fraction of which were coordinated with larger male-only schools (Tulane, Missouri, etc.) However, a significant number of early chapters were at schools which ceased operation before or during the Great Depression. One chapter had even been placed at a high school.  Because of the prevalence of chapters at 2-year schools and other non-accredited institutions, Beta Sigma Omicron operated independently of the NPC for its first forty years of existence.

As an independent sorority,  was at risk of chapters being "poached" by other national sororities.

Still, growth persisted. In  the sorority absorbed three of the four chapters of Pi Sigma Gamma, a small sorority that disbanded that year.

At Beta Sigma Omicron's  Convention (75th anniversary), a vote on absorption or disbanding was taken. Although Beta Sigma Omicron had chartered 61 chapters and had almost 15,000 initiated sisters, at the time of the anniversary, it only had 13 active chapters, and thus no longer met the National Panhellenic Conference's membership requirements. The vote was unanimous for absorption and Beta Sigma Omicron looked for an organization for merger. On , Beta Sigma Omicron was absorbed by Zeta Tau Alpha.

Of the 13 active chapters, seven were absorbed into Zeta Tau Alpha: Samford University (at the time, Howard College), Millsaps College, William Jewell College, the University of Evansville, Thiel College, Westminster College, and Youngstown College. Three others were released to join Alpha Phi, as Zeta Tau Alpha already had chapters on their campuses:  Louisiana State University, Baldwin Wallace University and Indiana University of Pennsylvania. Three small chapters at urban schools in New York and Ohio chose to become local sororities, but failed soon thereafter. A recent  chapter, which would have added a 14th active chapter to the merger negotiations, had been placed at Waynesburg University. That group survived, and became a chapter of Phi Sigma Sigma nine years after its withdrawal.

Symbols
The Badge was a monogram of the sorority letters, with the Omicron around the Beta and the Sigma superimposed on the Omicron.

Colors - Ruby and Pink
Flower - Red and Pink Carnations
Jewel - Ruby
Open Motto - We Live to do Good
Insignia - Stars, Covenant, Lamp, Laurel
Patron - Hestia
Magazine - The Beta Sigma Omicron, first published in 1905, The Lamp (esoteric), and The Urn 
Convention - June 1910 in Louisville, KY
Pledge Pin - Triangle of red enamel, displaying a Grecian lamp and three stars

Chapter List
These are the chapters of Beta Sigma Omicron at the time of the 1963 merger. Active chapters at the merger indicated in bold, inactive chapters indicated by italics. Similarly, fully inactive schools indicated by italics, while schools that merged remain in plain text.

References

Defunct former members of the National Panhellenic Conference
1888 establishments in Missouri
Student organizations established in 1888